Prosthecobacter algae is a Gram-negative, facultatively anaerobic and fusiform-shaped bacterium from the genus Prosthecobacter which has been isolated from activated sludge.

References

Verrucomicrobiota
Bacteria described in 2014